Seleucia is a genus of snout moths. It was described by Émile Louis Ragonot in 1887.

Species
 Seleucia karsholti Vives Moreno, 1995
 Seleucia pectinellum (Chrétien, 1911)
 Seleucia semirosella Ragonot, 1887

References

Anerastiini
Pyralidae genera
Taxa named by Émile Louis Ragonot